Joe Jackson's Jumpin' Jive is the fourth studio album by Joe Jackson. Released in 1981, it is a collection of covers of classic 1940s swing and jump blues songs originally performed by musicians such as Louis Jordan and Cab Calloway, the latter of whose song "Jumpin' Jive" was the eponym for this album.

The album and single were credited to Joe Jackson's Jumpin' Jive. Jackson's foray through jump blues anticipated the so-called "retro-swing revival" (Squirrel Nut Zippers, Big Bad Voodoo Daddy, Brian Setzer Orchestra) by a full fifteen years.

A remastered edition was released in late 1998.

Track listing

Personnel 
 Musicians
 Joe Jackson – vocals and vibraphone
 Pete Thomas – alto saxophone
 Raul D'Oliveira – trumpet
 Nick Weldon – piano
 Dave Bitelli – tenor saxophone and clarinet
 Graham Maby – bass
 Larry Tolfree – drums
 All – backing vocals

 Production
 Joe Jackson - arrangements, producer
 Norman Mighell - assistant producer, recording engineer
 Matt The Goose - assistant recording engineer
 Joe Jackson, Pete Thomas, Dave Bitelli, Raul D'Oliveira - horn arrangements
 Jeri Heiden and Sandy Brummels - art direction
 Anton Corbijn - photography

Charts

References

External links 
 Jumpin' Jive album information at The Joe Jackson Archive

Joe Jackson (musician) albums
1981 albums
A&M Records albums
Swing revival albums